HMS Success was an  28-gun sixth-rate wooden sailing ship notable for exploring Western Australia and the Swan River in 1827 as well as being one of the first ships to arrive at the fledgling Swan River Colony two years later, at which time she ran aground off Carnac Island.

History 
Her keel was laid at Pembroke Dock in August 1823 and she was launched on 31 August 1825.

She was sent by the Royal Navy on a mission to New South Wales and Melville Island.  She made an expedition to the Swan River in 1827, arriving there in early March.  Captain James Stirling was in command.  There is a record of the expedition, An account of the expedition of H.M.S. 'Success', Captain James Stirling, RN., from Sydney, to the Swan River, in 1827 by Augustus Gilbert.  Another account The visit of Charles Fraser (the colonial botanist of New South Wales) : to the Swan River in 1827, with his opinion on the suitableness of the district for a settlement was published in 1832.

On 3 December 1829 Success ran aground on Shag Rock, Carnac Island.

In February 1833 Success was fitted out as a receiving ship and from 1833 to 1849 was engaged in harbour service in Portsmouth.  She was broken up in 1849.

Success Hill, Success Bank, the suburb of Success and a number of other features in Western Australia are named after the ship.

References 

 

Atholl-class corvettes
1825 ships
Ships built in Pembroke Dock
Maritime incidents in December 1829